Raluca Olaru and Anna Tatishvili were the defending champions, but lost to Andrea Hlaváčková and Lucie Hradecká in the first round.
Raquel Kops-Jones and Abigail Spears won the title, defeating Hlaváčková and Hradecká in the final, 6–3, 7–5.

Seeds

Draw

References
 Main Draw

Generali Ladies Linz - Doubles
Generali Ladies Linz Doubles